"Love and Understanding" is a song by American singer and actress Cher from her 20th studio album, Love Hurts. Written by Diane Warren and produced by Warren and Guy Roche, it was released as the album's lead single in 1991 for the North American and Oceanian markets. B-side "Trail of Broken Hearts" appears on the soundtrack to the Tom Cruise film Days of Thunder and is not available on any Cher album.

Critical reception
AllMusic's Joseph McCombs highlighted the song and called it "pleasantly melodic." Larry Flick from Billboard described it as "a spirited pop tune that's framed with orchestral synth/strings and a hand-clapping rock beat. Simplistic lyrical message is delivered with warmth and sincerity. Sounds great on a summer day." Entertainment Weekly editor Jim Farber said it is "socially conscious in a way only Hollywood could conceive, tailor-made for one of those publicity-seeking charity functions."

Music video
The single spawned a music video that had Cher and her backing band rehearsing the song while interlocking scenes of her in an orange colored wig and  her dancers dancing around her are shown.

Personnel
 Cher: Vocals
 Jean McClain, Myriam Valle, Laura Creamer, Dianne Warren: Backing vocals
 Michael Landau, Josh Sklair: Guitars
 Guy Roche: Keyboards, synthesizers
 Mark T. Williams: Drums

Production
 Produced by Diane Warren and Guy Roche
 Recorded by David Thoener and Frank Wolf at A&M Recording Studios, The Music Grinder and The Complex
 Assistant engineers: Mario Luccy, Ken Allardyce, Julie Last, Jeff DeMorris, Fred Kelly
 Mixed by David Thoener

Track listings
 US 7-inch  and cassette single
 "Love and Understanding" – 4:43
 "Trail of Broken Hearts" – 4:30

 US and European 12-inch single
 "Love and Understanding" (12-inch dance mix) – 5:25
 "Love and Understanding" (Stringappella mix) – 4:20
 "Love and Understanding" (Dub and Understanding mix) – 5:35
 "Love and Understanding" (House of Love mix) – 5:45
 "Love and Understanding" (Cher Some Love dub) – 4:10
 "Trail of Broken Hearts" – 4:30

 European 7-inch and cassette single
 "Love and Understanding" (edit) – 4:08
 "Trail of Broken Hearts" – 4:30

 European CD single
 "Love and Understanding" (edit) – 4:08
 "Trail of Broken Hearts" – 4:30
 "If I Could Turn Back Time" – 4:16

Charts

Weekly charts

Year-end charts

Release history

References

External links
 Official website of Cher

1991 singles
1991 songs
Cher songs
Geffen Records singles
Songs written by Diane Warren